Catherine Duc is a Vietnamese-Australian composer and producer of music blending elements of ambient, classical, electronica and world music. Her work has been aired on Australian Broadcasting Corporation's ABC Jazz. In 2005 Duc issued her debut album, Visions and Dreams.

History 
Catherine Duc was born in Melbourne. She started her musical journey from a young age. As a child, Duc studied keyboard and classical piano and later completed studies in music arrangement, live recording and production at the Alfred Brash Sound House in the Melbourne Concert Hall. She also has a Diploma in Film Music Composition from The London School of Creative Studies. Her work has been aired on Australian Broadcasting Corporation's ABC Jazz. In July 2005 Duc issued her debut album, Visions and Dreams, and the following year she supplied keyboards for Priscilla Hernández' album, Ancient Shadows.

In October 2012 Duc released her latest single, "Single Glance", which was produced by Stuart Epps (Elton John, Robbie Williams). In an interview with Vents Magazine she revealed that she was finishing work on her second album and that the album has a lot more Celtic influences compared to her previous album, with a greater focus on live instruments (ranging from acoustic and electric guitars to mandolins, Irish flutes and bagpipes).

In 2015 she signed a record deal for her album "Voyager" with UK based label MG Music (owned by New Age composer and musician Medwyn Goodall) and received a Grammy nomination for 'Best New Age Album'.

In 2016 Duc remixed The Corrs' song "Intimacy" which was released through Warner Music UK.

Musical style 
Duc's music is a blend of Celtic and world melodies with contemporary electronica rhythms and atmospheric soundscapes. Anna Kosmanovski of Mediasearch described her style as "neo classical" and "Celtic, mystical sounding electronic, has none of the lullaby substance of ordinary classical music".

Discography

Albums
Voyager - MG Music (The Orchard) (1 July 2015)
Visions and Dreams - The Orchard (5 July 2005)

Singles
 "Remember When..." (featuring Jonas Isacsson) - The Orchard (16 July 2021) (Digital release)
 Z8phyR - "Drop of a Dream" (Catherine Duc Dream Remix) - Cool Breeze (28 February 2020) (Digital release)
 Ben Hobbs - "Blind to You" (Catherine Duc 'Stargazing' Remix) - Ben Hobbs (3 August 2018) (Digital release)
 Paloma Rush - "Drive" (Catherine Duc Rush Hour Remix) - Built To Last Music (14 April 2017) (Digital release)
 The Corrs - "Intimacy" (Catherine Duc Infinite Remix) - Warner Music UK (13 July 2016) (Digital release)
 "Single Glance" - The Orchard (26 October 2012) (Digital release)

Awards 
2016: Grammy Nomination for 'Best New Age Album'
2012: Music Oz Awards,Instrumental Finalist
2011: Hollywood Music in Media Awards, New Age Nomination
2008: Toronto International Music Awards, International Instrumental CD Album & Best International Instrumental Up and Coming Producer
2007: International Music Online Awards, Best Instrumental Artist
2006: Los Angeles Music Awards, Instrumental Artist of The Year
2006: Just Plain Folks Music Awards, World Music Nomination 
2005: Unisong International Songwriting Contest, Honorable Mention - Instrumental 
2002: Philips Australia Song Competition, Best Dance/Electronica Song

References

External links
 Catherine Duc Official site
 The Corrs - Intimacy (Catherine Duc Infinite Remix) on iTunes
 

Year of birth missing (living people)
Australian women composers
Australian composers
Australian electronic musicians
Living people
New-age musicians